Common Worship is the name given to the series of services authorised by the General Synod of the Church of England and launched on the first Sunday of Advent in 2000. It represents the most recent stage of development of the Liturgical Movement within the Church and is the successor to the Alternative Service Book (ASB) of 1980. Like the ASB, it is an alternative to the 1662 Book of Common Prayer (BCP), which remains officially the normative liturgy of the Church of England.

It has been published as a series of books, rather than a single volume, offering a wider choice of forms of worship than any of its predecessors. It was drafted by the Church of England's Liturgical Commission; the material was then either authorised by General Synod (sometimes with amendments) or simply commended for use by the House of Bishops.

Series
The main Common Worship book is called Common Worship: Services and Prayers for the Church of England. It was published in 2000 alongside Common Worship: President's Edition. These volumes contain the material for Sunday services, but unlike the ASB, contain no readings.

The third book to be published (also in 2000), Common Worship: Pastoral Services, provides for the first time a range of healing services, as well as revised provision for weddings and funerals. The former has a completely rewritten preface that no longer describes the threefold purposes of marriage and is much more secular in tone. It includes, for the first time, a congregational response to the declarations by the couple and a long nuptial blessing. The funeral provisions includes material for before and after the service, all completely rewritten. The funeral now includes an optional penitential section, no longer has a required psalm and includes set intercessions. It also allows for a eulogy by one of the mourners, a new departure, at the beginning of the service.

In 2005 the fourth book, Common Worship: Daily Prayer, was published. The form and style of daily morning and evening prayer no longer shows the influence of the BCP, but the work of the English Franciscan community and its book Celebrating Common Prayer. The offices are not dissimilar to those of the Roman Catholic Church. Penitence becomes optional, as does the Creed; the Te Deum disappears almost completely, and a Gospel canticle—the Benedictus in the morning and the Magnificat in the evening—follows the reading(s); there is a wide range of intercessions; collects are provided for lesser festivals (unlike in the main book); and there is a psalter. Both the book and the new daily lectionary were tried out in parishes before final publication.

In 2006, three more volumes, Common Worship: Christian Initiation, Common Worship: Ordination Services and Common Worship: Times and Seasons, were published. In the first, there is provision for Baptism, Confirmation, and related rites (including Reconciliation). In the second, there are rites for the ordination of deacons, priests and bishops. In the third, there is provision for all the seasons of the church's year, including sections on the Agricultural Year and Embertide.

The final book, Common Worship: Festivals, was published in 2008 and provides propers for all the Festivals and Lesser Festivals of the Church of England's calendar.

Several other books, although not part of the principal series, are part of the Common Worship series. Some reproduce parts of Common Worship in a different or more concise form, such as Holy Communion Order One, Additional Collects, Funeral, Marriage, Rites on the Way, Ministry to the Sick, The Reconciliation of a Penitent Form One, Holy Week and Easter (includes readings), and Time to Pray (containing Prayer During the Day and Night Prayer). Those that contain material not found in the rest of Common Worship series include books of readings (e.g. the Daily Eucharistic Lectionary), the annual lectionary (with references only), and Proclaiming the Passion: The Passion Narratives in Dramatized Form. Although not part of Common Worship, New Patterns for Worship is part of the same liturgical phase in the Church of England.

Content and style

Common Worship is published in electronic, as well as paper form, with the intent that congregations can assemble their own orders of service and extend them with prayers and readings. Many churches have produced separate books for each of a number of different types of service (Parish Communion, all age service, different church seasons, etc.) to their own specifications.

Like the ASB, Common Worship is mostly in modern language (though it retains versions of the Eucharist and other material in the language and using the structure of the Book of Common Prayer). The text of the modern language Eucharist is essentially identical to Rite A of the ASB and derives from the work of the International Commission on English in the Liturgy. The wording of the ordinary of the mass is therefore very similar to that of the first English version of the post-Vatican II Roman Missal (used until 2011). Unlike the ASB it consists not of one book but of several. The main book includes the Sunday services of Morning Prayer and Evening Prayer, Baptism (though not Confirmation), and various forms of Holy Communion, including eight Eucharistic Prayers, not all of which adhere to the Hippolytan form, and all of which are designed to be interpreted in a broadly Reformed sense, avoiding, for example, explicitly epicletic language with regard to the elements themselves. A separate book styled Pastoral Services contains the forms for Wholeness and Healing, Marriage, emergency Baptism, Thanksgiving for the Gift of a Child, and Funerals. The Daily Prayer book was published in 2005 (although a "Preliminary edition" circulated before that) and the seasonal book, Times and Seasons in 2006. This last is intended to make revised provision for the winter period including Advent and Epiphany as far as Candlemas - thus replacing the book, The Promise of his Glory - and to replace the book Lent, Holy Week and Easter.

The new lectionary authorised at the same time derives from the 1969 Roman Catholic Common Lectionary, which was revised in 1983 with ecumenical input as the Revised Common Lectionary and adopted by many denominations worldwide. The Common Worship lectionary differs from the Revised Common Lectionary at certain times of the year. This runs on a three-year cycle, A, B, and C, with, respectively, Matthew, Mark, and Luke being given the Gospel readings in one of the three years. The attempt to provide themes has been deliberately abandoned in favor of writers having their own voice in a sequence of readings, either of the whole book, or where books are long, parts of it. One of the reasons for this was to encourage consecutive expository preaching. There is, however, some provision for themes, in that the Old Testament reading can be chosen either to run continuously or to be chosen because it relates to the Gospel. No such provision is made for the New Testament reading. Material from St John's gospel is introduced at various points, especially at Festivals and in the summer of Year B.

The books provide a number of alternatives, rather than a single form, extending the process begun with the Alternative Services Book, but with the clear intention that it be treated as a resource book rather than used for worship. The expectation (contained in the electronic version) is that parishes will print (or project onto screens) texts for each week. The Service of the Word, authorised earlier but now incorporated into Common Worship, somewhat resembles the Directory for Public Worship produced during the Commonwealth, containing as it does directions as to structure, rather than a full liturgy. The "common" of Common Worship is in the framework and structure for each service, but allows for a variety of prayers and resources to be used within those common structures. In that respect, it is a departure from Cranmer's principle of uniformity: 'from henceforth all the whole Realm shall have but one use'.

The desire for diversity and variation has been criticised by some scholars, such as Mark Dalby (The Renewal of Common Prayer ed Perham (CHP 1993)), as making light of the principle of worship being 'common prayer'. Common Worship bears more than a passing resemblance to the pre-Reformation church of which Cranmer commented 'many times there was more business to find out what should be read than to read it when it was found out'. Others, however, have challenged this view. Common Worship Today (Mark Earey and Gilly Myers, eds.) makes the point that worship has always been more diverse than is implied by the use of a single book and views diversity as realistic and necessary.

One other respect in which Common Worship differs from its predecessor is in relation to the saints. While in the main volume only one eucharistic preface is provided for the saints, other books in the series (particularly Common Worship: Daily Prayer and Common Worship: Festivals) provide far more resources. The provision is distinctly Anglican, however, in that individuals are included who have not undergone formal canonization. The text tends to avoid statements about the eternal destiny of those who are celebrated.

Drafting and approval

The services and resources that comprise Common Worship represent the latest stage of a process of liturgical revision that began in the 1920s. They were originally drafted by the Liturgical Commission. The commission is made up of a variety of people with different expertise, including lay people, parish clergy and bishops, liturgists, and theologians. The material was passed on to the House of Bishops, which amended the material as it saw fit. It was then presented to the General Synod.

Forms of services that were alternative to equivalents in the Book of Common Prayer were debated by Synod and revised by a synodical Revision Committee in the light of the comments made by Synod members and the wider public. The House of Bishops then reconsidered them, put them into their final form, and submitted them to the General Synod for Final Approval as Authorized Services. To be authorized, each service had to gain a two-thirds majority in each House of the Synod (bishops, clergy, and laity).

Additional material, which had no equivalent in the Book of Common Prayer, was debated by the General Synod and then put in its final form and Commended by the House of Bishops.

In the case of authorized services in Common Worship, the Archbishops' Council gave some 800 parishes permission to use draft forms of service on an experimental basis before they were presented to the General Synod. The services were adjusted in the light of feedback from this "field testing".

See also

Religion in the United Kingdom

References

External links
Online edition of Common Worship

Church of England
Book of Common Prayer
Christian prayer books
Series of books
Anglican liturgical books
da:Ritualbog
sv:Kyrkohandbok